Shadow of Fear is the fourteenth and final studio album by English electronic music group Cabaret Voltaire, released on 20 November 2020 by Mute Records. The album was recorded and mixed at Western Works, which is the same studio that the band has used throughout their history. The album is Cabaret Voltaire's first and only release with Richard H. Kirk as the sole member of the band.

The album was made available for pre-order on 19 August 2020. The debut single, "Vasto", was also made available for streaming on the same day. The album was generally well-received by critics, with a score of 79/100 on Metacritic.

Track listing

References

2020 albums
Cabaret Voltaire (band) albums
Mute Records albums